The 1908 United States presidential election in Alabama took place on November 3, 1908. All contemporary 46 states were part of the 1908 United States presidential election. Alabama voters chose eleven electors to the Electoral College, which selected the president and vice president.

Alabama was won by the Democratic nominees, former Representative William Jennings Bryan of Nebraska and his running mate John W. Kern of Indiana.

Results

Results by county

Source:

See also
United States presidential elections in Alabama

Notes

References

Alabama
1908
1908 Alabama elections